Regional Federation of Mining Cooperatives of Huanuni (in Spanish: Federación Regional de Cooperativas Mineras de Huanuni, Fercomin) is a political grouping in Villa Huanani, Oruro Department, Bolivia. Fercomin won the municipal elections in December 2004, gaining three out of the five seats in the municipal council. In total Fercomin received 2 470 votes. Policarpio Calani of Fercomin became the mayor of the city. The councillors of Fercomin are Eloy Tola (president of the council), Sonia Condori (secretary of the council) and Santusa Challapa (replacer of the seat vacated when Calani became mayor).

Political parties in Bolivia
Miners' labor movement